The WFWA Canadian Heavyweight Championship was the title contested for in the Manitoba-based professional wrestling promotion West Four Wrestling Alliance.

Title history

See also

Professional wrestling in Canada

References

External links
WFWA Canadian Heavyweight title history at Wrestling-Titles.com

Heavyweight wrestling championships
Canadian professional wrestling championships